The three teams in this group played against each other on a home-and-away basis. West Germany won the group over Northern Ireland and Greece and qualified for the seventh FIFA World Cup held in Chile.

Standings

Matches

References

3
1960–61 in German football
Qual
1960–61 in Northern Ireland association football
1961–62 in Northern Ireland association football
1960–61 in Greek football
1961–62 in Greek football